Daryl Veltman (born September 25, 1985) is a Canadian professional lacrosse player. He is currently a member of the New England Black Wolves in the National Lacrosse League.

High School/College career
Veltman attended the Connecticut college-preparatory Salisbury School, before enrolling at Hobart and William Smith Colleges. Veltman played collegiate lacrosse for the Hobart College Statesmen. As a freshman in 2005, he was honored by the ECAC Lacrosse League as "Rookie of the Year."  During his freshman season, Veltman led his team in scoring.  In all three subsequent seasons, he would continue his team's leading scorer. Veltman was recognized by the conference with ALL-ECAC team honors three times, including first-team recognition as a senior.

Canadian Box career

Junior
Veltman played junior box lacrosse in the Ontario Lacrosse Association.  From 2000 to 2002, Veltman was a member of the Halton Hills Bulldogs in the OLA Junior B Lacrosse League. In 2002, he was named his conference's Most Valuable Player.  From 2003 to 2006 he played Junior A lacrosse with the Orangeville Northmen. In 2005, he led the OLA Junior A Lacrosse League in scoring with a career high 102 points.

Senior
After some controversy about transferring provinces within the Canadian Lacrosse Association, Veltman moved west to British Columbia and joined the Coquitlam Adanacs of the Western Lacrosse Association in 2007. During his rookie season, Veltmen helped the Adanacs to a league championship and their first Mann Cup appearance since 2001.

Professional career
Veltman was selected with the first overall pick by the expansion Boston Blazers of the National Lacrosse League in the 2008 NLL Entry Draft.  In his rookie season, Veltman was named Rookie of the Week twice, and was also named Rookie of the Month for both January and February.

Veltman is the nephew of Jim Veltman, former Toronto Rock captain and current Rock advisor and National Lacrosse League all-time loose-ball leader.

On August 8, 2015, Veltman signed a two-year contract with the Buffalo Bandits

International career
In 2003, he represented Team Canada at the Under-19 World Lacrosse Championships, helping his team win the silver medal.

Statistics

Hobart College

National Lacrosse League

Canadian Lacrosse Association

References

1985 births
Living people
Boston Blazers players
Canadian lacrosse players
Hobart Statesmen lacrosse players
Hobart and William Smith Colleges alumni
Sportspeople from Brampton